The Lower Rio Grande Valley, commonly known as the Rio Grande Valley or locally as the Valley or RGV, is a region spanning the border of Texas and Mexico located in a floodplain of the Rio Grande near its mouth. The region includes the southernmost tip of South Texas and a portion of northern Tamaulipas, Mexico. It consists of the Brownsville, Harlingen, Weslaco, Pharr, McAllen, Edinburg, Mission, San Juan, and Rio Grande City metropolitan areas in the United States and the Matamoros, Río Bravo, and Reynosa metropolitan areas in Mexico. The area is generally bilingual in English and Spanish, with a fair amount of Spanglish due to the region's diverse history and transborder agglomerations It is home to some of the poorest cities in the nation, as well as many unincorporated, persistent poverty communities called colonias. A large seasonal influx occurs of "winter Texans" — people who come down from the north for the winter and then return north before summer arrives.

History

Pre-Spanish colonization 

Native peoples lived in small tribes in the area before the Spanish conquest. The native tribes in South Texas were known to be hunter-gatherer peoples. The area was known for its smaller nomadic tribes collectively called Coahuiltecan. Native archaeological excavations near Brownsville have shown evidence of prehistoric shell trading.

Spanish colonization 

Initially, the Spanish had a hard time conquering the area due to the differences in native languages, so they mainly focused on the coast of the Gulf of Mexico also known as the  Seno Mexicano. Also, a major conflict existed on who would  conquer the region. Antonio Ladrón de Guevara wanted to colonize the region, but the Viceroy of New Spain José Tienda de Cuervo doubted Ladrón de Guevara's character, eventually leading to a royal Spanish declaration preventing Ladrón de Guevara from participating in colonization efforts.

The first villas in the region were settled in Laredo and Reynosa in 1767. In 1805, the Spanish government solidified the autonomy of the region by defining the territory of Nuevo Santander as south of the colony of Tejas from the Nueces River south to Tampico, Charcas, and Valles. The local government of the region had a rough start with various indigenous wars up until 1812. In 1821 after the Mexican War of Independence, the state was renamed Tamaulipas.

Republic of Texas and annexation by the United States 

The Texas Revolution of 1835-1836 put the majority of what is now called the Rio Grande Valley under contested Texan sovereignty. The area also became a thoroughfare for runaway slaves fleeing to Mexico.

In 1844, the United States under President James K. Polk annexed the Republic of Texas, against British and Mexican sentiments, contributing to the onset of the Mexican–American War. The area along the Rio Grande was the source of several major battles, including the Battle of Resaca de la Palma near Brownsville. The war ended in 1848 with the signing of the Treaty of Guadalupe Hidalgo which defined the United States' southern border as the Rio Grande. The change in government led to a mass migration from Tamaulipas to the United States side of the river.

From the end of the Mexican-American War, the population of the Valley began to grow, and farmers began to raise cattle in the area. Despite the end of the formal war in 1848, interracial strife continued between native peoples and the white settlers over land through the 1920s.

Early 1900s and the Mexican Revolution 

At the turn of the 20th century trade and immigration between Mexico and the United States was a normal part of society.  The development of the St. Louis, Brownsville, and Mexico Railway in 1903 and the irrigation of the Rio Grande allowed the Rio Grande Valley to develop into profitable farmland. Droughts in the 1890s and early 1900s caused smaller farmers and cattle ranchers to lose their lands. Rich white settlers brought by the railroad bought the land and displaced the Tejano ranchers.

Meanwhile, across the river, Mexico was dealing with the Mexican Revolution. The revolution spilled over the border through cross-border supply raids, and in response President Taft sent the United States Army into the region beginning in 1911 and continuing until 1916 when the majority of the United States armed forces were stationed in the region. Texas governor Oscar Colquitt also sent the Texas Rangers into the area to keep the peace between Mexicans and Americans.

The region played host to several well known conflicts including the backlash from the Plan of San Diego, and the racially fueled violence of Texas Ranger Harry Ransom. In 1921 the United States Border Patrol came to the region with less than 10 officers. Initially the agency was focused on import and export business, especially alcohol during Prohibition in the United States, but later moved to detaining illegal aliens.

The region had a significant increase of Border Patrol agents during World War I in conjunction with the Zimmermann Telegram. The Texas Rangers also increased their presence as law enforcement in the region with a new class of Ranger that focused on determining Tejano loyalty. They were often violent, carrying out retaliatory murders. They were never held accountable to the law even though charges were brought in the Texas senate.

There were two major military training facilities in the Valley in Brownsville and Harlingen during World War II.

Post World War II to present 

The North American Free Trade Agreement, also known as NAFTA, was established in 1994 as a trade agreement between the three North American countries, The United States, Mexico, and Canada. NAFTA was supposed to increase trade with Mexico as they lowered or eliminated tariffs on Mexican goods. Exports and imports tripled in the region and accounted for a trade surplus of $75 billion. The Rio Grande Valley benefited from NAFTA in retail, manufacturing, and transportation. Due to the influx of jobs and exportation, many people migrated to the RGV, both documented and undocumented. According to Akinloye Akindayomi in Drug violence in Mexico and its impact on the fiscal realities of border cities in Texas: evidence from Rio Grande Valley counties, NAFTA also indirectly aids the rise in immigration and drug smuggling practices between cartels in the region, with cartels profiting with over $80 billion. The Trump Administration decided to make new accords with Mexico and Canada and replaced NAFTA with the new trade agreement, United States–Mexico–Canada Agreement (USMCA) in 2018.After the September 11 attacks, the Customs Border Security Act of 2001 established United States Border Patrol interior checkpoints with some situated at the north end of the Rio Grande Valley. This allows for a second line of defense in the ever increasing subtlety of smuggling.

More recently the organization We Build The Wall has begun construction on a section of the border wall in the Valley. Local residents have express concerns about the project including the site's proximity to the National Butterfly Center and the Rio Grande with its potential for seasonal flooding. The U.S. Section of the International Boundary and Water Commission has ordered We Build The Wall to stop until they can review whether or not the construction violates a Treaty to resolve pending boundary differences and maintain the Rio Grande and Colorado River as the international boundary between the United States and Mexico signed in 1970.

Geography

The Rio Grande Valley is not a true valley, but a river delta. "Valley" is often used in the western United States to refer to a large expanse with rivers. Most such valleys, including the Rio Grande, have good agricultural production. Early 20th-century land developers, attempting to capitalize on unclaimed land, utilized the name "Magic Valley" to attract settlers and appeal to investors. The Rio Grande Valley is also called El Valle, the Spanish translation of "the valley", by those who live there. The main region is within four Texan counties: Starr County, Hidalgo County, Willacy County, and Cameron County.

Major settlements 
The largest city on the American side of the region is Brownsville (Cameron County), followed by McAllen (Hidalgo County). Other major cities include Harlingen, San Benito, Edinburg, Mission, Rio Grande City, Raymondville, Weslaco, Hidalgo and Pharr. On the Mexican side of the border Matamoros, Río Bravo, and Reynosa are major cities in this region.

Demographics
As of 2020, the U.S. Census Bureau estimated the population of the Rio Grande Valley at 1,368,723. Hidalgo County has the largest population with an estimate of 861,137. Cameron County has the second-highest population estimated at 422,135. Starr County has the third-largest population estimated at 64,032. Willacy County has the fourth-largest population estimated at 21,419.

According to the U.S. Census Bureau in 2008, 86 percent of Cameron County, 90 percent of Hidalgo County, 97 percent of Starr County, and 86 percent of Willacy County are Hispanic.

Colonias 

The major metropolitan areas in the Rio Grande Valley are surrounded by smaller rural communities called colonias. These communities are primarily poor and Hispanic.  The areas often lack basic services like sanitation and sewage, and suffer from flooding. Many of these colonias are mixes of mobile homes and self-constructed houses owned by the residents. The Bracero program enacted in the 1940s allowed Mexicans to cross the border and work in the agricultural fields. Most worked in the Rio Grande Valley, and due to a shortage of affordable houses, developers started selling them land in unincorporated areas; these clusters of homes over time became what are now known as colonias. According to the Housing Assistance Council, a nonprofit organization that tracks rural housing, approximately 1.6 million people live in 1,500 recognized colonias alongside the Mexico–United States border.

Language use 
The residents of the Lower Rio Grande Valley are generally bilingual in English and Spanish often mixing into Spanglish depending on demographics and context. Government statistics for the region are often underreported due to underlying immigration issues.

The Spanish language plays an important role in all aspects of life. In 1982 a statistically significant majority of people in the Rio Grande Valley spoke Spanish. People speak Spanish to communicate in all aspects of life including business, government, and at home.

People often prefer Spanish to English when interacting with government officials as seen in the response to the region's 2018 flooding.

Religion 
The Catholic Church has been present in the Rio Grande Valley since the Spanish colonization of the region. In San Juan, Texas the Basilica of the National Shrine of Our Lady of San Juan del Valle is a major Catholic shrine.

One of the offshoots of the Catholic Church, worship of Santa Muerte, has a small but significant following in the valley. There has been public outcry against followers erecting shrines at their homes and in public places. In 2015 a Santa Muerte statue was involved with a bomb scare in San Benito, Texas. This followed the desecration of a Santa Muerte statue in the San Benito Municipal Cemetery in January of the same year.

In addition to the Catholic Church, several other Christian denominations are present in the Rio Grande Valley, including several organized Protestant churches in the Lower Rio Grande Valley and 26 congregations of the Church of Jesus Christ of Latter-day Saints with about 17,000 members. The church began with a small branch serving the area in the early 1900s, and by 1952 there were two stakes. The El Paso 3rd Ward became the Church's first Spanish-speaking ward when it was created in 1952. In 2019, the Church announced the construction of the McAllen Texas Temple.

Sikh, Muslim, Hindu, Jewish, Buddhist and Baháʼí Faith communities thrive in the Rio Grande Valley.

Climate 
The Lower Rio Grande Valley experiences a warm and fair climate that brings visitors from many surrounding areas. Temperature extremes range from triple digits during the summer months to freezing during the winter. While the Valley has seen severe cold events before, such as the 2004 Christmas snow storm and 2021 cold snap, the region rarely experiences temperatures at or below freezing, especially by the coast, which transitions into a Tropical climate.

The regions's proximity to the Gulf of Mexico makes it a target for hurricanes. Though not impacted as frequently as other areas of the Gulf Coast of the United States, the Valley has experienced major hurricanes in the past. Hurricanes that have made landfall in or near the area include: Hurricane Beulah (1967), Hurricane Allen (1980), Hurricane Gilbert, Hurricane Bret, Hurricane Dolly (2008), Hurricane Alex (2010), and Hurricane Hanna (2020). Having an especially flat terrain, the Valley usually experiences the catastrophic effects of tropical cyclones in the form of flooding.

Tourism
The Lower Rio Grande Valley encompasses landmarks that attract tourists. Popular destinations include Laguna Atascosa National Wildlife Refuge, Santa Ana National Wildlife Refuge, Bentsen-Rio Grande Valley State Park, South Padre Island, Brazos Island, and the Port Isabel Lighthouse.

The Valley is a popular waypoint for tourists visiting northeast Mexico.  Popular destinations across the border and Rio Grande include: Matamoros, Nuevo Progreso, Río Bravo, and Reynosa, all located in the Mexican state of Tamaulipas.

The region also attracts tourists from the Mexican states of Tamaulipas, Nuevo León, Coahuila, and Mexico, D.F. (México City).

Places of historical interest

Basilica of the National Shrine of Our Lady of San Juan del Valle
First Lift Station
Laguna Atascosa National Wildlife Refuge
Santa Ana National Wildlife Refuge
Hugh Ramsey Nature Park
Los Ebanos Ferry, last hand-operated ferry on the Rio Grande
La Lomita Historic District
Fort Brown
Palo Alto Battlefield National Historic Site
Resaca de la Palma
Rancho de Carricitos
USMC War Memorial original plaster working model, located on the campus of the Marine Military Academy in Harlingen
Museum of South Texas History, originally the County Court House and Jail, built in the late 19th century
Battle of Palmito Ranch, location of the last battle of the Civil War
Brownsville Raid
Battle of Resaca de la Palma

Economy
The Valley is historically reliant on agribusiness and tourism. Cotton, grapefruit, sorghum, maize, and sugarcane are its leading crops, and the region is the center of citrus production and the most important area of vegetable production in the State of Texas. Over the last several decades, the emergence of maquiladoras (factories or fabrication plants) has caused a surge of industrial development along the border, while international bridges have allowed Mexican nationals to shop, sell, and do business in the border cities along the Rio Grande. The geographic inclusion of South Padre Island also drives tourism, particularly during the Spring Break season, as its subtropical climate keeps temperatures warm year-round. During the winter months, many retirees (commonly referred to as "Winter Texans") arrive to enjoy the warm weather, access to pharmaceuticals and healthcare in Mexican border crossings such as Nuevo Progreso. There is a substantial health-care industry with major hospitals and many clinics and private practices in Brownsville, Harlingen, and McAllen.

Texas is the third largest producer of citrus fruit in the United States, the majority of which is grown in the Rio Grande Valley. Grapefruit make up over 70% of the Valley citrus crop, which also includes orange, tangerine, tangelo and Meyer lemon production each Winter.

There are two minor professional sports teams that play in the Rio Grande Valley: The Rio Grande Valley Vipers (basketball), and Rio Grande Valley FC Toros (soccer). Defunct teams that previously played in the region include: the Edinburg Roadrunners (baseball), La Fiera FC (indoor soccer), Rio Grande Valley Ocelots FC (soccer), Rio Grande Valley WhiteWings (baseball), Rio Grande Valley Killer Bees (ice hockey), and the Rio Grande Valley Sol (indoor football).

One of the Valley's major tourist attractions is the semi-tropical wildlife.  Birds and butterflies attract a large number of visitors every year all throughout the entire region.  Ecotourism is a major economic force in the Rio Grande Valley.

Transportation
Valley International Airport serves the Rio Grande Valley community, with service on seven passenger and two cargo airlines, including one international passenger airline, Mexico's VivaAerobus.

There are several bus lines that run through the United States side of the Lower Rio Grande Valley including Metro Connect (McAllen), McAllen Paratransit, McAllen Metro Services, Brownsville Metro/ADA Paratransit Service Island Metro (South Padre Island), and Greyhound Lines. On the Mexican side of the border there are several bus companies that run including Greyhound, Tornado, Ave Senda Ejecutiva, Enlaces Terrestres Nacionales, Futua, Noreste, Omnibus de Oriente, Transpais, Transportes del Norte, Transportes Frontera, and Turistar Lujo.

The Interstate Highway System in the United States is well developed in the Lower Rio Grande Valley and connects Brownsville, Hidalgo, McAllen, Raymondville, Edinburg, Pharr, and Laredo. On the Mexican side, there are several major highways between Matamoros, Reynosa, and Nuevo Laredo.  car travel on the Mexican side was considered dangerous and the Mexican Federal Police offered a police escort between Ciudad Victoria, Matamoros, and Reynosa.

Freight trains run between Harlingen, Mission, Edinburg, and Santa Rosa connecting to the Union Pacific Railroad. In Mexico, Kansas City Southern de México runs freight service and crosses from Matamoros into Brownsville over the Brownsville & Matamoros International Bridge.

Sea trade runs through the deepwater seaport, the Port of Brownsville and the Foreign Trade Zone 62.

SpaceX South Texas launch site is located near Brownsville. Elon Musk is also building an ocean spaceport named Deimos intended for transport to and from Mars.

Politics

The region is represented by Ted Cruz and John Cornyn in the United States Senate and by Filemon Vela Jr. and Vicente Gonzalez in the United States House of Representatives.

In the twenty-first century, the dominance of agribusiness has caused political issues, as jurisdictional disputes regarding water rights have caused tension between farmers on both sides of the U.S.-Mexico border. Scholars, including Mexican political scientist Armand Peschard-Sverdrup, have argued that this tension has created the need for a re-developed strategic transnational water management. Some have declared the disputes tantamount to a "war" over diminishing natural resources.  Climatologists believe water scarcity in the Valley will only increase as climate change alters the precipitation patterns of the region.

Democratic candidate Beto O'Rourke received 164,232 votes from the region, compared to incumbent Ted Cruz's 79,049, in his failed bid to replace Cruz in the Senate in 2018.

Unlike most of Texas the Rio Grande Valley is strongly Democratic having last voting for a Republican presidential candidate in 1972 and only 3 times since 1912 along with 1952 and 1956.

In 2016, Donald Trump's won only 29 percent of the region's vote, an 80-year low for Republicans. However, in 2020, he significantly strengthened the Republican vote in the Rio Grande Valley, reducing, among other things, Hillary Clinton's 2016 60-point margin of victory in 96% Hispanic Starr County to only 5 points.

Education
Historically education has posed significant challenges to schools in the region. Schools in the early 1920s through the 1940s were racially segregated in the Rio Grande Valley. In 1940 a study showed the need for improvement in cultural differentiation of instruction. The Texas Supreme Court in Del Rio ISD v. Salvatierra  reinforced the racial segregation. In 1968, President Lyndon B. Johnson signed the Bilingual Education Act, helping students whose second language was English. The Act gave financial assistance to local schools to create bilingual programs, enabling Mexican students to integrate white schools. The area like many others had a hard time integrating. Texas still has the bilingual program, while states like California, Arizona, and Massachusetts, have removed the bill and passed similar propositions stating that students would only be taught in English. The bilingual program in the Rio Grande Valley is still in effect especially with Deferred Action for Childhood Arrivals students in the area.

Colleges and universities located in the Rio Grande Valley include:

 Texas A&M Health Science Center, School of Public Health - McAllen
 Texas A&M University - McAllen Campus
University of Texas Rio Grande Valley — Entered into full operation in 2015 with the merger of the University of Texas at Brownsville and the University of Texas–Pan American.
 University of Texas Rio Grande Valley School of Medicine
Texas Southmost College
Texas State Technical College
South Texas College
University of Texas Health Science Center - Regional Academic Health Center

Sports

Defunct

Hospitals
 Cornerstone Regional Hospital, Edinburg, Texas
 Edinburg Children's Hospital, Edinburg, Texas
 Edinburg Regional Medical Center, Edinburg, Texas
 Doctors Hospital at Renaissance, Edinburg, Texas
 Harlingen Medical Center, Harlingen, Texas
 McAllen Heart Hospital, McAllen, Texas
 McAllen Medical Center, McAllen, Texas
 Rio Grande Regional Hospital, McAllen, Texas
 Rio Grande State Hospital, Harlingen, Texas
 Solara Hospital, Harlingen, Texas
 VA Health Care Center at Harlingen. Harlingen, Texas
 Valley Baptist Medical Center, Harlingen, Texas
 Valley Baptist Medical Center, Brownsville, Texas
 Valley Regional Medical Center, Brownsville, Texas
 Knapp Medical Center, Weslaco, Texas
 Mission Regional Medical Center, Mission, Texas

Media

Magazines
 The Go Guide (published by Above Group Advertising Agency)
Rio Grande Magazine
 Viva el Valle 
 RGV Drives Magazine (published by MAT Media Solutions)
RGVision Magazine (published by RGVision Media)

Newspapers
  Valley Town Crier - owned by Gatehouse Media
  The Edinburg Review - owned by Gatehouse Media
  Valley Bargain Book - owned by Gatehouse Media
 El Periódico USA 
 El Nuevo Heraldo - owned by AIM Media Texas
 Mega Doctor News
 Texas Border Business
 The Brownsville Herald - owned by AIM Media Texas
 The Island Breeze - owned by AIM Media Texas
 The Monitor - owned by AIM Media Texas
 Valley Morning Star - owned by AIM Media Texas
 Valleywood Magazine - owned by Valleywood Publications
 The Donna News - owned by Valleywood Publications
 Weslaco World - owned by Valleywood Publications
 La Feria Journal - owned by Valleywood Publications
 South Padre Island Post - owned by Valleywood Publications

Television
 KGBT-TV/DT channel 4, Antenna TV Affiliate
 KRGV-TV/DT Channel 5 News, ABC Affiliate
 KVEO-TV/DT Local 23/CBS 4 (DT-2), NBC/CBS Affiliate
 KCWT-CD 21, The CW Affiliate
 KTFV-CD 32, UniMás Affiliate
 KFXV TV/DT 60, FOX Affiliate
 KLUJ-TV/DT 44, TBN Affiliate
 KTLM-TV/DT 40, Telemundo Affiliate
 KNVO TV/DT 48, Univision Affiliate
 KMBH-LD 67, Fox 2 News, Fox Affiliate
 XERV-TDT 9.1 Las Estrellas, Televisa
 XHAB-TDT 8.1 Vallevision, Televisa
 XHOR-TDT 14.1 Azteca 7, TV Azteca
 XHREY-TDT1.1 Azteca Uno, TV Azteca

Radio
 
 KBFM Wild 104 (Hip Hop/Top 40 - IHeart Media)
 XEEW-FM Los 40 Principales 97.7 (Top 40 Spanish/English)
 KBTQ 96.1 Exitos (Spanish Oldies) Univision
 KCAS 91.5 FM (Christian, Teaching/Preaching/Music)
 KESO  92.7 KESO (Classic Hits)
 KFRQ Q94.5 The Rock  (Classic Rock) (All Rock All The Time)
 KGBT 1530 La Tremenda (Univision)
 KGBT-FM 98.5 FM (Regional Mexican) Univision
 KHKZ Kiss FM 105.5 & 106.3 (Hot Adult Contemporary)
 KIRT 1580 AM Radio Imagen (Variety, Spanish contemporary)
 KIWW (Spanish)
 KJAV  Ultra 104.9 Sonamos Differente (Spanish AC & English HAC) (AC)
 KKPS Fuego 99.5 (Spanish Hot AC (International hits)
 KJJF/KHID 88.9/88.1 Religious (Relevant Radio)
 KNVO-FM La Suavecita 101.1 (Spanish Hits)
 KQXX Kiss FM 105.5 & 106.3 (Hot Adult Contemporary, simulcast of KHKZ - IHeart Media)
 KTEX 100.3 (Mainstream Country - IHeart Media)
 KURV 710 AM Heritage Talk Radio (part of the BMP family of stations)
 KVLY 107.9 RGV FM (AC) (More Hits, More Variety)
 KVMV 96.9 FM (Christian, Contemporary Music) World Radio Network
 KVNS 1700AM (Fox Sports Radio - IHeart Media) 
 XHRYA-FM 90.9 Mas Music (Spanish/English Mix)
 KBUC Super Tejano 102.1 (Tejano)

Notable people
A list of notable people who were born, lived, or died in the Rio Grande Valley includes:
 Abraham Ancer (professional golfer, Olympian)
 Ramón Ayala (singer)
 David V. Aguilar (Chief Border Patrol Agent, United States Border Patrol)
 Cristela Alonzo (comedian, actress, writer, producer)
 Micaela Alvarez (federal judge)
 Natalia Anciso (contemporary artist)
 Gloria E. Anzaldúa (writer, poet, philosopher)
 Cathy Baker (television performer)
 Lloyd Bentsen (U.S. Secretary of the Treasury; U.S. Senator; 1988 Vice-Presidential candidate)
 James Carlos Blake (novelist)
 Harlon Block (Iwo Jima flag raiser)
 William S. Burroughs (writer; his time as a farmer in the Valley in Pharr, Texas, is briefly chronicled in his books Junky and Queer)
 Pedro Cano (Medal of Honor recipient)
 Rolando Cantú (football player)
 Raúl Castillo (actor)
 Thomas Haden Church (actor) 
 Freddy Fender (actor, musician, lyricist)
 Mike Fossum (astronaut) 
 Reynaldo Guerra Garza (United States Court of Appeals for the Fifth Circuit judge) 
 Kika de la Garza  (U.S. Representative)
 Roberto Garza (football player)
 Xavier Garza (author and illustrator)
 Tony Garza (U.S. Ambassador to Mexico) 
 Alfredo C. Gonzalez (Medal of Honor Recipient, U.S. Marine Veteran)
 Matt Gonzalez (2008 Vice-Presidential candidate; former president of the Board of Supervisors of San Francisco, California)
 Esteban Jordan (accordionist) 
 Bill Haley (musician) 
 Catherine Hardwicke (writer; film director-producer)
 Rolando Hinojosa (author) 
 Rubén Hinojosa  (U.S. Representative)
 Kris Kristofferson (musician, actor, songwriter)
 Tom Landry (American football coach, Mission, Texas)
 Bobby Lackey (College Football Player; Weslaco, Texas)
 José M. López (Medal of Honor Recipient)
 Domingo Martinez (author)
 Eduardo Martinez (Historian, Journalist)
 Roy Mitchell-Cárdenas (musician)
 Jack Morava (mathematician)
 Rachel McLish (Ms. Olympia; actress) 
 Bobby Morrow (Olympic gold medalist)
 Billy Gene Pemelton (1964 Olympian)
 Major Samuel Ringgold (father of modern artillery)
 Charles M. Robinson III (author)
 Valente Rodriguez (actor)
 Ricardo Sanchez (U.S. Army lieutenant general; Ground forces commander in Iraq)
 Julian Schnabel (filmmaker)
 Adela Sloss Vento
 Merced Solis aka Tito Santana (wrestler)
 Nick Stahl (actor)
 Emeraude Toubia (actress)
 Filemon Bartolome Vela (federal judge)
 Eric Miles Williamson (novelist, literary critic, professor)
 Raquel Gonzalez (wrestler)

See also

References

External links

Texas State Historical Association — Lower Rio Grande Valley
Rio Grande Valley Partnership: Valley Chamber 
Rio Grande Valley Sports Information Center
South Padre Island Turtle Cam
Rgvattractions.com: Attractions in the Rio Grande Valley
Rio Grande Valley Community Foundation
RGVPride.com
Los Ebanos, TX
Wintertexaninfo.com: The Winter Texan Connection
KERA documentary about agricultural workers, “A Thirst in the Garden,” The Walter J. Brown Media Archives & Peabody Awards Collection at the University of Georgia, American Archive of Public Broadcasting

 
Rio Grande
Valleys of Texas
Valleys of Mexico
Regions of Texas
Wetlands of Texas
Landforms of Cameron County, Texas
Landforms of Hidalgo County, Texas
Landforms of Starr County, Texas
Landforms of Willacy County, Texas
Landforms of Tamaulipas
Rio Grande basin